Balázs Zamostny (born 31 January 1992) is a Hungarian forward who plays for Nyíregyháza.

Career statistics
.

Honours
Újpest
Hungarian Cup (1): 2013–14

References

External links
 Player profile at HLSZ 
 
 

1992 births
Living people
Sportspeople from Pécs
Hungarian footballers
Hungary youth international footballers
Hungary under-21 international footballers
Association football forwards
Pécsi MFC players
Újpest FC players
BFC Siófok players
Vasas SC players
Szombathelyi Haladás footballers
Soproni VSE players
Győri ETO FC players
FC Ajka players
Nyíregyháza Spartacus FC players
Nemzeti Bajnokság I players
Nemzeti Bajnokság II players